Woollens Brook, a minor tributary of the River Lea, rises close to Ermine Street, south of Hertford Heath  and flows through Box Wood in Hertfordshire. The stream flows under both the A10 and the Dinant Link Road roundabout with Amwell Street. The stream then runs parallel with Essex Road before going under it and through the Lampits where it joins another minor tributary of the River Lea, the River Lynch, at Bridgeways

References

Tributaries of the River Lea
Rivers of Hertfordshire
2Woollens